Clif Norrell is an American record producer, recording engineer, music mixer, and musician. He has worked with many prominent artists including Bruce Springsteen, R.E.M., Jeff Buckley, No Doubt, Rush, Faith No More, Shania Twain, Mick Jagger, Dave Grohl, Sting, Paul McCartney, Gavin Degraw, Joss Stone, Selena Gomez and The Police.

Norrell was nominated for two Grammy Awards and two TEC Awards for his engineering work on Springsteen's 2012 album Wrecking Ball and its single "We Take Care of Our Own", as well as an additional TEC Award nomination for his work on Sting's album 57th and 9th.  Norrell has been featured in many articles, books, and music conferences.  Norrell also mixed the first commercial music-only release in Dolby Atmos immersive sound format for the 25th Anniversary edition of R.E.M.'s Automatic for the People album.

Early career
Starting with a long background as a trained trumpet player and guitarist, Norrell began his studio career at the legendary Ocean Way Recording in Los Angeles, the world's most awarded recording studio, in the mid 1980s under the mentorship of renowned audio guru Allen Sides. Throughout his years there as staff engineer, Norrell honed his skills while working with superstars like Bruce Springsteen, Prince, Beastie Boys, Van Halen, and many others. He also learned his craft by working with such legendary producers and engineers as Arif Mardin, Glyn Johns, Andy Johns, Norman Granz, and many other top contemporary producers.   Starting out in the era when analog recording technology was at its peak and digital technology was just starting to be more widely used in studios, Norrell continues to incorporate vintage analog tape recorders and processing together with the latest in digital audio advancements to achieve the sound and feel he and the artists envision for each project.

Partial discography

References

External links
 

American audio engineers
Living people
Year of birth missing (living people)